Thulium(II) chloride is an inorganic compound with the chemical formula TmCl2.

Production
Thulium(II) chloride can be produced by reducing thulium(III) chloride by thulium metal:
 2 TmCl3 + Tm → 3 TmCl2

Chemical properties
Thulium(II) chloride reacts with water violently, producing hydrogen gas and thulium(III) hydroxide. When thulium(II) chloride first touches water, a light red solution is formed, which fades quickly.

References

Lanthanide halides
Thulium compounds
Chlorides